Leo Nolan (born August 18, 1972) is an American former professional boxer.

Biography
Nolan was born and raised in Detroit. As a junior he boxed for Kronk Gym for three years. He turned professional in 1992, winning his first five pro fights before his career was interrupted in 1996 after he was convicted of being an accomplice in a robbery of an off-duty police officer and sentenced to five years in prison. He was also shot five times in the incident. He was released in 2000, and after being out of boxing for almost eight years, returned to the ring in 2001. By 2007, Nolan had won all of his 26 professional fights. Past opponents include Lou Savarese, Jeremy Bates, and Andy Sample, and he has won the IBU intercontinental Heavyweight title and the IBA Americas Heavyweight Title.  He suffered his first defeat to unheralded heavyweight Hector Ferreyro in 2007.

His career was interrupted again in June 2009 when he was shot in the neck during an attempted car-jacking.

He was stopped for the first time in his professional career in December 2009 by Alexander Povetkin, his second defeat from 29 professional fights.

Professional boxing record

|-
|align="center" colspan=8|27 Wins (10 knockouts, 17 decisions), 2 Losses (1 knockout, 1 decision)
|-
| align="center" style="border-style: none none solid solid; background: #e3e3e3"|Result
| align="center" style="border-style: none none solid solid; background: #e3e3e3"|Record
| align="center" style="border-style: none none solid solid; background: #e3e3e3"|Opponent
| align="center" style="border-style: none none solid solid; background: #e3e3e3"|Type
| align="center" style="border-style: none none solid solid; background: #e3e3e3"|Round
| align="center" style="border-style: none none solid solid; background: #e3e3e3"|Date
| align="center" style="border-style: none none solid solid; background: #e3e3e3"|Location
| align="center" style="border-style: none none solid solid; background: #e3e3e3"|Notes
|-align=center
|Loss
|
|align=left| Alexander Povetkin
|KO
|3
|05/12/2009
|align=left| Arena Ludwigsburg, Ludwigsburg, Germany
|align=left|
|-
|Win
|
|align=left| Mike "The Hammer" Jones
|UD
|8
|10/10/2008
|align=left| DeCarlo's Convention Center, Warren, Michigan
|align=left|
|-
|Loss
|
|align=left| Hector Ferreyro
|MD
|12
|26/01/2007
|align=left| Destiny's, Orlando, Florida
|align=left|
|-
|Win
|
|align=left| Jed Phipps
|DQ
|8
|26/08/2006
|align=left| Club Cinema, Pompano Beach, Florida
|align=left|
|-
|Win
|
|align=left| Wallace McDaniel
|UD
|8
|29/06/2006
|align=left| The Plex, North Charleston, South Carolina
|align=left|
|-
|Win
|
|align=left| Marcel Beresoaie
|TKO
|3
|23/04/2005
|align=left| Westfalenhallen, Dortmund, Germany
|align=left|
|-
|Win
|
|align=left| Andy Sample
|KO
|3
|01/04/2005
|align=left| DeCarlo's Convention Center, Warren, Michigan
|align=left|
|-
|Win
|
|align=left| Lou Savarese
|UD
|12
|07/05/2004
|align=left| Foxwoods, Mashantucket, Connecticut
|align=left|
|-
|Win
|
|align=left| Ken Murphy
|UD
|8
|02/04/2004
|align=left| DeCarlo's Banquet Center, Warren, Michigan
|align=left|
|-
|Win
|
|align=left| Jeremy Bates
|TKO
|4
|13/06/2003
|align=left| Joe Louis Arena, Detroit, Michigan
|align=left|
|-
|Win
|
|align=left| John Basil Jackson
|TKO
|3
|17/05/2003
|align=left| Hammond Civic Center, Hammond, Indiana
|align=left|
|-
|Win
|
|align=left| Don Normand
|TKO
|6
|14/03/2003
|align=left| DeCarlo's Banquet Center, Warren, Michigan
|align=left|
|-
|Win
|
|align=left| Chavez Francisco
|UD
|8
|10/01/2003
|align=left| DeCarlo's Banquet Center, Warren, Michigan
|align=left|
|-
|Win
|
|align=left| Bryan Blakely
|UD
|4
|30/11/2002
|align=left| Civic Center, LaPorte, Indiana
|align=left|
|-
|Win
|
|align=left| Frank Wood
|TKO
|5
|20/09/2002
|align=left| DeCarlo's Banquet Center, Warren, Michigan
|align=left|
|-
|Win
|
|align=left| Mario Cawley
|UD
|10
|21/06/2002
|align=left| DeCarlo's Banquet Center, Warren, Michigan
|align=left|
|-
|Win
|
|align=left| Curt Render
|TKO
|1
|27/04/2002
|align=left| Jarrell's Gym, Savannah, Georgia
|align=left|
|-
|Win
|
|align=left| Terry Porter
|UD
|6
|29/03/2002
|align=left| Club International, Detroit, Michigan
|align=left|
|-
|Win
|
|align=left| David J. Cherry
|KO
|4
|31/01/2002
|align=left| The Roostertail, Detroit, Michigan
|align=left|
|-
|Win
|
|align=left| Willie Driver
|UD
|6
|07/12/2001
|align=left| Club International, Detroit, Michigan
|align=left|
|-
|Win
|
|align=left| Julius Long
|UD
|6
|09/11/2001
|align=left| Club International, Detroit, Michigan
|align=left|
|-
|Win
|
|align=left| Mike Brown
|UD
|4
|12/10/2001
|align=left| Club International, Detroit, Michigan
|align=left|
|-
|Win
|
|align=left| Mark Johnson
|UD
|4
|10/08/2001
|align=left| Cobo Hall, Detroit, Michigan
|align=left|
|-
|Win
|
|align=left| Val W. Smith
|UD
|6
|10/04/2001
|align=left| Andiamo's Banquet Center, Warren, Michigan
|align=left|
|-
|Win
|
|align=left| Exum Speight
|PTS
|4
|25/05/1993
|align=left| The Palace of Auburn Hills, Auburn Hills, Michigan
|align=left|
|-
|Win
|
|align=left| Ron Carter
|SD
|4
|10/04/1993
|align=left| Toledo, Ohio
|align=left|
|-
|Win
|
|align=left| Rick Willis
|PTS
|4
|27/10/1992
|align=left| The Palace of Auburn Hills, Auburn Hills, Michigan
|align=left|
|-
|Win
|
|align=left| Joe Senegal
|KO
|2
|05/09/1992
|align=left| Saginaw, Michigan
|align=left|
|-
|Win
|
|align=left| "Killer" Keith Williams
|TKO
|3
|25/08/1992
|align=left| The Palace of Auburn Hills, Auburn Hills, Michigan
|align=left|
|}

References

External links
 

1972 births
Living people
Boxers from Detroit
Heavyweight boxers
American male boxers